Back-formation is either the process of creating a new lexeme (less precisely, a new "word") by removing actual or supposed affixes, or a neologism formed by such a process. Back-formations are shortened words created from longer words, thus back-formations may be viewed as a sub-type of clipping.

Each back-formation in this list is followed by the original word from which it was back-formed.

A
 abduct probably from abduction 
 abscess (v.) from abscessed
 aborigine from aborigines, mistaken for a plural noun
 accord (n.) from Old French acorde, acort, a back-formation from acorder
 accrete from accretion (root: accrescere)
 acculturate from acculturation
 addict from addicted (root: addicere)
 admix from admixt
 Adirondack Mountains from Adirondacks, mistaken for a plural noun
 adsorb from adsorption
 adolesce from adolescence
 adulate from adulation
 advect from advection
 advisor perhaps from advisory
 aerate (meaning "expose to air") probably from aeration
 aesthete from aesthetic
 aggress from aggression
 air-condition from air conditioning
 alley 
 alliterate from alliteration 
 allotrope from allotropy 
 amaze from Middle English amased 
 ambivalent from ambivalence 
 ameliorate perhaps from amelioration in some cases 
 annunciate perhaps from annunciation in some cases 
 anticline from anticlinal
 antipode from antipodes (non-standard)
 appeal (n.) from Old French apel, back-formation from apeler
 apperceive (in modern psychological use) from apperception 
 aristocrat from French aristocrate, a back-formation from aristocratie 
 assent (n.) from Old French assent, a back-formation from assentir
 attrit from attrition
 auto-destruct from auto-destruction (cf. auto-destroy)
 automate from automation
 aviate from aviation
 avid partly from avidity 
 awe-strike perhaps from awestruck

B
 babysit from babysitter
 back-form from back-formation
 bartend from bartender
 beg from beggar
 benefact from benefactor (and also the derived benefactee, cf. benefactor)
 bibliograph from bibliography
 bicep from biceps (non-standard)
 biograph from biography
 bird (verb) from bird watcher
 blockbust from blockbuster
 book-keep from book-keeping
 brainwash from brainwashing
 bulldoze from bulldozer
 bum possibly from bummer
 burgle from burglar
 bus ("to clear dirty dishes from table") from busboy
 bushwhack from bushwhacker
 buttle from butler

C
 cadge from cadger
 caretake from caretaker
 cavitate from cavitation
 chain-smoke from chain-smoker
 Chess (river) from Chesham
 choate from inchoate
 choreograph from choreography
 chupacabra from Spanish chupacabras (both a plural and a singular in Spanish)
 claustrophobe from claustrophobia
 cohese from cohesion (disambiguation) (cf. cohere)
 commentate from commentator
 committal from non-committal
 complicit from complicity
 computerize from computerized
 contracept from contraception (cf. rare contraceive)
 contrapt from contraption
 convect from convection
 conversate from conversation or conversing
 cose from cosy
 couth from uncouth
 co-vary from covariation
 cross multiply from cross multiplication
 cross-refer from cross-reference
 curate (verb) from curator
 custom-make from custom-made

D
 dapple from dappled
 darkle from darkling
 decadent from decadence
 deconstruct from deconstruction
 dedifferentiate from dedifferentiation
 demarcate from demarcation
 demograph from demographics
 destruct from destruction
 diagnose from diagnosis
 diffract from diffraction
 dinge from dingy
 diplomat from diplomatic
 dishevel from disheveled
 donate from donation
 drear from dreary
 drowse from drowsy (possibly a backformation)
 dry-clean from dry cleaning

E
 eave from eaves
 eavesdrop from eavesdropper
 edit from editor (from Latin stem edere, to bring forth)
 electrocute from electrocution
 elocute from elocution
 emote from emotion
 enthuse from enthusiasm
 escalate from escalator
 eutrophicate from eutrophication
 evaluate from evaluation
 explicate (meaning "explain") from explicable
 extradite from extradition
 extrapose from extraposition

F
 fine-tune from fine tuning
 flab from flabby
 flappable from unflappable
 flake ("eccentric person") from flaky
 floss ("to show off") from flossy
 fluoresce from fluorescence
 fragmentate from fragmentation
 free-associate from free association (backformed adjective-verb compound)
 funk (quality of music) from funky

G
 gamble from gambler
 gestate from gestation
 ghostwrite from ghostwriter
 gid from giddy
 gladiola from gladiolus
 gnarl from gnarled
 goaltend from goaltender
 godsend from god-sent
 greed from greedy (the noun was originally "greediness")
 grid from gridiron
 grovel from groveling
 grunge from grungy
 gruntle from disgruntle

H
 handwrite from handwriting
 hard-boil from hard-boiled
 hawk (meaning "to sell") from hawker
 haze from hazy
 headhunt from headhunter
 headquarter from headquarters
 helicopt from helicopter
 herptile (a reptile or amphibian) from herpetology
 herpe (a single herpes sore) from herpes
 housebreak from housebroken
 houseclean from housecleaning
 housekeep from housekeeper
 hustle from hustler

I
 inadvertent from inadvertence
 ideologue from ideology
 incent from incentive
 indice from indices (cf. index)
 injure from injury
 intercept from interception (possibly a backformation)
 interfluve from interfluvial
 interlineate from interlinear
 intuit from intuition
 isolate from isolated

J
 jell from jelly
 jerry-build from jerry-built

K

 kidnap from kidnapper
 kudo from kudos (some commentators regard it non-standard)

L
 lase from laser
 laze from lazy
 legislate from legislator
 letch from lecher
 liaise from liaison
 loaf (meaning "to be idle") from loafer
 logroll from logrolling
 luminesce from luminescent

M
 manipulate from manipulation
 mase from maser
 mentee from mentor
 mix from mixt (adj. from Old French, misconstrued as past participle of verb)
 mottle from motley
 moonlight (the verb, work on second job) from moonlighter
 multimillion from multimillionaire

N
 nake from naked
 nitpick from nit-picking
 notate from notation

O
 obsess (meaning "to behave obsessively") from obsessive

 obligate (as a verb meaning "oblige") from obligation
 one-up or one-upman from one-upmanship
 orate from oration
 orientate from orientation

P
 panhandle (meaning "to accost") from panhandler
 paramedic from paramedical
 partake from partaker
 patriation from repatriation
 pea from Middle English pease
 peddle from peddler
 peeve from peevish
 pettifog from pettifogger
 phosphoresce from phosphorescent
 pleb from plebs
 ply from reply
 preempt from preemption
 process from procession
 prodigal from prodigality
 proliferate from proliferation
 proofread from proofreader
 pugn from impugn

Q
 quadrumvir from quadrumvirate
 quantitate from quantitative

R
 raunch from raunchy
 recurse from recursion
 reminisce from reminiscence
 resurrect from resurrection
 ruly from unruly
 rotovate from rotovator

S
 sass (impudence) from sassy
 scavenge from scavenger
 sculpt from sculptor
 secrete (meaning "to produce and emit") from secretion
 secretive from secretiveness
 sedate (the verb) from sedative
 self-destruct from self-destruction (cf. self-destroy)
 semantic (adjective) from semantics
 sharecrop from sharecropper
 shoplift from shoplifter
 sightsing from sightsinging
 sightsee from sightseeing
 sipid from insipid
 sleaze from sleazy
 sleepwalk from sleepwalking
 smarm from smarmy
 sorb from sorption (also a back-formation)
 soft-land from soft landing (backformed adjective-noun compound)
 sorption from adsorption and absorption
 spectate from spectator
 stargaze from stargazer
 statistic from statistics
 stave (the noun) from staves (the original singular is staff)
 steamroll from steamroller
 stridulate from stridulation
 suburb from suburban 
 suckle from suckling
 sulk from sulky
 summate from summation
 sunburn (the verb) from sunburned
 superannuate from superannuated
 surreal from surrealism
 surveil from surveillance
 swashbuckle from swashbuckler
 swindle from swindler
 syncline from synclinal

T
 tamale, as a singular of tamales (plural form of tamal)
 tase from Taser
 taxon from taxonomy 
 televise from television
 tongue-lash from tongue-lashing
 transcript (verb) from transcription (cf. verb transcribe)
 tricep from triceps (non-standard)
 trickle-irrigate from trickle-irrigation (possibly backformed from verb-noun compound but may also be verb-verb compound)
 tweeze from tweezers
 typewrite from typewriter

U
 underwhelming as a supposed antonym of overwhelming
 unit from unity 
 upholster from upholstery
 ush from usher

V
 vaccinate from vaccination
 vend as in vend out (meaning to contract out to a vendor), derived from vendor
 vinify from vinification
 vint (meaning to make wine) from vintage and vintner
 vivisect from vivisection

W
 wiretap from wiretapper

References

Back-formations
Neologisms